Castolus is a genus of assassin bugs in the family Reduviidae. There are about 16 described species in Castolus.

Species
These 16 species belong to the genus Castolus:

 Castolus annulatus Maldonado & Brailovsky, 1992-01
 Castolus bicolor Maldonado, 1976
 Castolus bolivari Brailovsky, 1982
 Castolus ferox (Banks, 1910)
 Castolus fuscoapicatus (Stål, 1860)
 Castolus lineatus Maldonado, 1976
 Castolus multicinctus Stål, 1872
 Castolus nigriventris Breddin, 1904
 Castolus pallidus Maldonado, 1976
 Castolus pecus
 Castolus plagiaticollis Stål, 1858
 Castolus rufomarginatus Champion, 1899
 Castolus spissicornis (Stål, 1860)
 Castolus subinermis (Stål, 1862)
 Castolus tricolor Champion, 1899
 Castolus trinotatus (Stål, 1866)

References

Further reading

External links

 

Reduviidae
Articles created by Qbugbot